Angshuman Kar is a Bengali poet and professor of English literature at Burdwan University. He is currently working as a professor of English at the University of Burdwan, West Bengal. He had served as the Secretary of the Eastern Region, Sahitya Akademi as well as a member of advisory board (Bengali) of the Sahitya Akademi.

Early life and career
Kar was born in Beliatore, Bankura, and graduated from J. K. College, Purulia.

He received the fellowship of the Australia–India Council for his research into Aboriginal petitions. He has held positions in various Australian universities.

Bibliography

Poetry
Khelna Pistol, Prachhaya, Barasat,1998
Bou Ke Nie Lekha Kabita, Kabita Dashdine, Kolkata, 1998
Garie Namchhi, Kabita Pakshik, Kolkata, 1999
Apel Saharer Samrat, Kabita Dashdine, Bankura, 2001
Bankura Purulia Kolkata, Prativash, Kolkata, 2004
Nasho Square Feeter Jadukar, Saptarshi Prakashan, Kolkata, 2006
Mukhomukhi Dui Kobi (written with Tarapada Roy), Papyrus, 2007
Jehadi Tomake, Saptarshi Prakashan, Kolkata, 2008
Amar Sonar Harin, Saptarshi Prakashan, Kolkata, 2012

Prose
The Politics of Social Exclusion in India: Democracy at the Crossroads, Routledge, Co-editor, with Harihar Bhattacharyya and Partha Sarkar, 2009 (history)
Paribortan, Parampara, Kolkata, 2011 (novel)
25 Paysar Itihas Boi, Parampara, Kolkata, 2010 (memoir)
Contemporary Indian Diaspora: Literary and Cultural Representations, 2015
Bikhato Hoibar Sahaj Upay, 2015

Awards
 Krittibas Award (2007)
 Paschimbanga Bangla Akademi Award (2009)
 Bongiya Sahitya Parishad Puroskar (2012)

Controversy
On 23 July 2020, allegations of sexual harassment were made against Kar in a complaint email that was forwarded to the Vice Chancellor of the University of Burdwan. The allegations state that he has engaged in sexual relations with several of his students and has sexually abused at least one of them.

However, in September 2021, Kolkata High Court took down all the charges against Dr. Kar, and also gave him clean chit.

References

External links
Angshuman Kar books at Amazon.in
Angshuman Kar books at Flipkart

Bengali writers
Bengali-language writers
21st-century Bengali poets
Bengali-language poets
1975 births
Writers from Kolkata
21st-century Indian poets
Bengali male poets
Living people
21st-century Indian male writers